Cyrillic Iota (Majuscule: Ꙇ, Minuscule: ꙇ) is a Cyrillic letter based on the Greek letter Iota, and is used in scholarly literature since the 19th century to transcribe Glagolitic Izhe, Ⰹ.  The character was introduced into Unicode 5.1 in April 2008, under the character block Cyrillic Extended-B.

Computing codes

References